The Court of the Imperial Stud, also known as the Court of the Imperial Stables, was a central government agency in several imperial Chinese and Vietnamese dynasties. It was generally in charge of managing state horse pasturage, stables and corrals, as well as maintaining the vehicles for use by the imperial household and members of the central government. In China, the office was created during the Northern Qi dynasty (550–577) and continued until the Qing dynasty (1636–1912). In Vietnam, it was created by Lê Thánh Tông in 1466, and continued until the Nguyễn dynasty.

It was one of the Nine Courts. During the Song dynasty, the agency also contained offices in charge of elephants and camels.

References

Nine Courts
Government of the Song dynasty
Government of the Tang dynasty
Government of the Yuan dynasty
Government of the Sui dynasty
Government of the Ming dynasty
Government of the Qing dynasty